The 1994 NCAA Division I Women's Tennis Championships were the 13th annual championships to determine the national champions of NCAA Division I women's singles, doubles, and team collegiate tennis in the United States, held during May 1994 in Athens, Georgia.

Hosts Georgia defeated Stanford in the team championship, 5–4, to claim their first national title.

Host
This year's tournaments were hosted by the University of Georgia at the Dan Magill Tennis Complex in Athens, Georgia. This was the first time the Lady Bulldogs hosted the women's championships.

The men's and women's NCAA tennis championships would not be held jointly until 2006.

Team tournament

See also
NCAA Division II Tennis Championships (Men, Women)
NCAA Division III Tennis Championships (Men, Women)

References

External links
List of NCAA Women's Tennis Champions

NCAA Division I tennis championships
NCAA Division I Women's Tennis Championships
NCAA Division I Women's Tennis Championships
NCAA Division I Tennis Championships
NCAA Division I Women's Tennis Championships